József Zvara (17 August 1966) is a former Hungarian professional footballer who played as a forward. He was a member of the Hungarian national football team.

Career 
He started his football career at Vác FC. From there he moved to Vasas SC, where he made his debut in the top flight in 1984. In 1988 he played again for a short time for Vác FC, before returning to Angyalföld, Vasas. From 1994 he played for Vác FC again. Between 1996 and 1997 he retired from active football with FC Hatvan.

National team 
In 1992 he played twice for the national team.

Honours 

 UEFA European Under-19 Championship
 Gold medal: 1984, Soviet Union
 Magyar Kupa (MNK)
 Winner: 1986

References 

1966 births
Living people
Hungary international footballers
Nemzeti Bajnokság I players
Vác FC players
Vasas SC players
FC Hatvan footballers
Hungarian footballers
Association football midfielders
People from Vác
Sportspeople from Pest County